Dünyamalılar (also, Dun’yamalylar, Dünyamallar, and Dunyamallar) is a village and municipality in the Beylagan Rayon of Azerbaijan.  It has a population of 5,968.

References 

Populated places in Beylagan District